Heimat is a series of films written and directed by Edgar Reitz about life in Germany from the 1840s to 2000 through the eyes of a family from the Hunsrück area of the Rhineland-Palatinate. The family's personal and domestic life is set against the backdrop of wider social and political events. The combined length of the 5 films – broken into 32 episodes – is 59 hours and 32 minutes, making it one of the longest series of feature-length films in cinema history.

The title Heimat is a German word, often translated as "homeland" or "home place", but it has been alleged that the word has no true English equivalent. Usage has come to include that of an ironic reference to the film genre known as Heimatfilm which was popular in Germany in the 1950s. Heimat films were characterised by rural settings, sentimental tone and simplistic morality.

Aesthetically, the series is notable for the frequent switching between colour and black-and-white film to convey different emotional states. In 1987 it won a BAFTA for "Foreign Television Programme".

The first "Heimat" film covered the years 1918 to 1982, and was released in 1984. It was followed by "Die Zweite Heimat" in 1993 that is set during the 1960s. In 2003, a direct sequel to both was released, with lead actors from both films returning as their characters. In 2006 a film was created by editing unused footage and outtakes together, along with newly filmed material to produce, "Heimat Fragments". A prequel film to the original was released in 2013.

Background

Tales from the Hunsrück Villages
Before creating the Heimat series, Edgar Reitz produced a documentary during 1980–81 about people from his home region, the Hunsrück, where he later set the Heimat series. In Geschichten aus den Hunsrückdörfern he showed people who had not left the region, unlike Heimats theme of leaving home. This documentary is not considered to be part of the core Heimat series but set the stage for the work to come a few years later.

Autobiographical elements
Berkeley film and media professor Anton Kaes argued that auteur film-maker Reitz's trilogy was autobiographical. Reitz and Paul Simon, his fictional character in Heimat, had fathers who were skilled craftsmen. Edgar Reitz was born in 1932 and Paul Simon in 1898 in Hunsrück. They grew up there, then left when they were in their twenties and returned in their fifties. Like Hermann Simon in the 1950s, Reitz left rural life for the world of German urban avant-garde arts and intelligentsia. Reitz worked at the Institute of Film Design in Ulm, while Hermann became a celebrated conductor in Munich. Wealthy American entrepreneur Paul Simon returned to Hunsrück only briefly when the war ended, but Hermann Simon's return was more permanent. He and his lover Clarissa restored a house overlooking the Rhine that lay in ruins, eventually composing music for representing and celebrating his relationship to Heimat. Both Hermann and Reitz "dramatized the tensions between staying home, leaving and returning" (Kaes 1989:164), Hermann through music and Reitz through film.

Development
After watching Holocaust, Reitz was offended by the American 'melodramaticisation' of the tragic events and the positive reception the film received. In 1979, Reitz began to make notes of his own life and completed a 250-page screenplay draft based upon his youth. Later in the year, Reitz contacted Peter Steinbach and together after what was planned to be a single night, they stayed for the next thirteen months in a small hut in Woppenroth writing a script. They became friendly with the local villagers and  invited them to comment on the characters and incidents in the story.  
In 1980, Reitz and Steinbach completed a 2,000-page screenplay. The success of Berlin Alexanderplatz had convinced television production companies that there was a market for sagas. After some haggling, Reitz managed to secure funding for the length of the script and remodeling of five Hunsrück villages.

Shooting began on the first film in May 1981, and continued for eighteen months. The cast consisted of 140 speaking parts, 32 full-time actors, 15 non-professional actors and 3,862 extras. Many of the cast had limited stage experience or no acting experience at all. While shooting, the villagers became heavily involved in the project and helped with re-modelling or set changes depending on the time period. Villagers put out advertisements in nearby villages in hope to find authentic items that could be used as props.

During shooting, Reitz decided that certain elements required extra emphasis that only colour could provide. However, Reitz was quick to deny any theories behind the alternations between black-and-white and colour.

Thirteen months were required for editing with Reitz working alongside Heidi Handorf. Together they created an eighteen-hour rough cut that was later trimmed to just over fifteen hours. Post-production continued until the premiere at Munich Film Festival in 1984. The entire project had taken over five years to complete.

While making Heimat, Reitz had become interested in developing a series of love stories with the working title of Men and Women. However, in October 1985, Reitz decided to make these tales the basis of Die Zweite Heimat. The film follows the character Hermann as he leaves to study music in Munich and meets new friends, who are all following their own dreams.

Running at over 25 hours, Die Zweite Heimat took over six years to write and production lasted 557 days, between 1988 and 1992. The cast comprised 71 leading actors, 310 supporting actors and 2,300 extras. The film's soundtrack also became the longest soundtrack ever produced.

Films

Heimat
Heimat, the original series, premiered in 1984 and follows the life of Maria Simon, a woman living in the fictional village of Schabbach.  It was filmed in and around the village of Woppenroth in Rhein-Hunsrück, a rural region of Germany to the west of the Rhineland-Palatinate. Subtitled Eine Deutsche Chronik — A German Chronicle, it consists of 11 episodes running in total to 15 hours 24 minutes of screen time. The film spans 1919 to 1982, and depicts how historical events affect the Simon family and the community in which they lived. At the start of each episode, Karl Glasisch narrates the story so far over photographs by Eduard Simon. The digitally remastered version merged some of the episodes together, resulting in seven episodes instead of eleven. No material was cut.

Die zweite Heimat (Leaving Home)
Die zweite Heimat (literally "The Second Heimat"; English title Heimat 2) (subtitled Chronik einer Jugend — Chronicle of a Youth) followed in 1992. It is set during the socially turbulent years of the 1960s and depicts how Maria's youngest son Hermann leaves his rural home and makes a new life for himself as a composer in Munich.

Hermann is a musical prodigy whose teenage romance in 1955 with 26-year-old soul-mate Klärchen was considered scandalous by his conservative home village. It resulted in her being expelled and coerced to never contact him again. Hermann felt crushed, vowing never to love again and to leave his village forever. He arrives in Munich at age 19, overwhelmed and with no place to stay. He finds a private room available in a month, leaving the deposit with a flamboyant Hungarian woman. His friend Renate, a law student, allows Hermann to sleep on her floor but he is put off by her sexual advances. He finally stays with Clemens, a fellow Hunsrücker who plays jazz drums in Munich's clubs. Hermann is accepted into the music conservatory, where he meets the talented Juan from Chile, whose school application is rejected on the grounds his marimbas are "folklore". Hermann and Juan network within the avant-garde culture surrounding the conservatory, which includes film students, while Hermann takes odd jobs and Juan works as a gymnastics teacher. Both Juan and Hermann have a brief fling with the beautiful cellist Clarissa, who is drawn to those who also fear intimacy. The students are gradually drawn to the Foxhole, a mansion headed by a wealthy art patroness said to be a "collector of artists". A remaster of "Die Zweite Heimat" was released in 2022.

Heimat 3
Heimat 3 (subtitled Chronik einer Zeitenwende — Chronicle of a Changing Time) premiered in 2004. It continues Hermann's story in 1989 as he returns to Schabbach and depicts the events of the period from the fall of the Berlin Wall until 2000. The cinema version consists of six episodes running to 11 hours 29 minutes, although controversially the version broadcast on the German ARD television network in December 2004 was edited to six 90-minute episodes and it is this 20% shorter version which was released on DVD.

Heimat-Fragmente (Heimat Fragments)
Heimat-Fragmente (English title Heimat Fragments), subtitled Die Frauen — The Women, was released in cinemas in 2006 and focuses on the women of the Simon family at the turn of the millennium, and in the 1960s. It uses deleted scenes and outtakes from the previous films, along with newly filmed material to create a narrative that mostly focuses on Lulu looking back on her family history.

Die andere Heimat (Home from Home)

In April 2012, Reitz started filming a prequel to the series: Die andere Heimat (literally "The other Heimat"; English title Home from Home), with the subtitle Chronik einer Sehnsucht — Chronicle of a Vision. The film takes place between 1840 and 1844 and centres around two brothers, their families and love relations from the Hunsrück area and their decision whether to flee hunger and poverty by emigrating to Brazil. Principal filming was completed in August 2012. It was screened at the Venice Film Festival in September 2013. The film was awarded a score of 70 on critical aggregator website Metacritic, indicating generally favorable reviews.

Cast

Heimat

 Marita Breuer as Maria Simon (née Wiegand) (7 August 1900 – 18 September 1982)
 Michael Lesch (episodes 1&2) and Dieter Schaad (episodes 8, 10&11) as Paul Simon (1898–1984)
 Karin Kienzler (episodes 1&2) and Eva Maria Bayerwaltes (episodes 3–8) as Pauline Kröber (née Simon) (1904–75)
 Rüdiger Weigang as Eduard Simon (1897–1967)
 Gertrud Bredel as Katharina Simon (née Schirmer) (10 November 1875 – 10 May 1947)
 Willi Berger as Mathias Simon (11 June 1872 – 23 January 1945)
 Johannes Lobewein as Alois Wiegand (1870–1965)
 Kurt Wagner as Glasisch-Karl (1900–1982)
 Eva Maria Schneider as Marie-Goot (1882–1960)
 Alexander Scholz as Hänschen Betz (1908 – 15 January 1944)
 Arno Land as Robert Kröber (1902–1944)
 Karin Rasenack as Lucie Simon (née Hardtke) (1906–1978)

Die Zweite Heimat

  as Hermann Simon (29 May 1940– ). He left home 2 September 1960 after vowing to never love again. Falls in love with Hermann.
 Salome Kammer as Clarissa Lichtblau (c.1940– ). Plays the cello obsessively. Has a relationship with Volker and briefly Juan. Falls in love with Hermann
 Anke Sevenich as Waltraud 'Schnüsschen' Schneider (c.1940– ). A childhood friend of Hermann.
 Noemi Steuer as Helga Aufschrey (June, 1939– ). A troubled student who falls in love with Hermann. Has a difficult life.
 Daniel Smith as Juan Subercasseaux (c.1940– ). Is from Chile and speaks eleven languages. Ends up being looked after by Elizabeth Cerphal.
 Gisela Müller as Evelyne Cerphal (July 1942– ). After discovering her mother is not her biological mother, she seeks out her real mother with help of Ansgar and Frau Ries.
 Michael Seyfried as Ansgar Herzsprung (1938–1962). Studied medicine.
 Michael Schönborn as Alex (c.1935– ). Philosophy student.
  as Reinhard Dörr. Film Student
 Peter Weiss as Rob Stürmer. Film student.
 Frank Röth as Stefan Aufhauser. Law student.
 Lena Lessing as Olga Müller. Aspiring actress. Has relationships with Ansgar and Reinhard.
 Armin Fuchs as Volker Schimmelpfennig. A senior music student.
 Martin Maria Blau as Jean-Marie Weber (1939– ) When a child, he lived in Narbonne, south of France and went to boarding school in France and Switzerland.
 Franziska Traub as Renate Leineweber (c.1942– ). Was a law student but after meeting Hermann follows her dreams of being a performer.
 Hannelore Hoger as Elizabeth Cerphal (1911– ). Evelyne's aunt and older sister Arno, Evelyne's father (8 August 1919) who died in 1941.
 Manfred Andrae as Gerold Gattinger. Lives with Elizabeth and looks after her finances.
 Hanna Köhler as Frau Moretti. Originally allows Hermann to stay in her spare room. She becomes an admirer of him.
 Fred Stillkrauth as Kohlen-Josef. Owner of coal yard where Hermann and Clemens live in the early episodes.
  as Herr Edel (c.1910–1961). A man who tells all the young students about Munich's history and famous philosophers and artists. 
 Veronica Ferres as Dorli. A friend of Helga.
 Irene Kugler as Marianne Westphal (1929– ). A friend of Helga who seduces Hermann in the fifth episode.
 Daniel Much as Tommy (c.1950). Hermann teaches him piano in the fifth episode.
 Eva Maria Schneider as Marie-Goot. Hermann's great aunt.
 Eva Maria Bayerwaltes as Pauline Kröber. Hermann's step aunt.
 Kurt Wagner as Glasisch Karl.

Characters
Simon family
 Matthias Simon (11 June 1872 – 23 January 1945), a blacksmith married to Katharina Schirmer (1875–1947). They are parents of Eduard, Pauline, and Paul.
 Eduard Simon (1897–1967), mayor of Rhaunen who was convinced early in life that there was gold in the Hunsrück streams. He always had trouble with his lungs; during treatment in Berlin, he met and later married Lucie Hardtke (1906–1978), a brothel madam who embraced life in the Hunsrück. They had a child, Horst Simon (1934–1948), who was killed at an early age, after discovering a landmine in the forest.
 Paul Simon (1898–1984), owner of Simon Electric. He married Maria Wiegand in 1922 and fathered Anton and Ernst (see Maria Wiegand below). After returning from fighting in World War I, Paul felt claustrophobic in Hunsrück society and ran away to the U.S. in 1928 to start Simon Electric in Detroit, Michigan. He returned in 1945 and visited until 1947. He left again the day of his mother's funeral.
 Pauline Simon (1904–1975), assistant jewelry shop owner. Married watchmaker Robert Kröber (1897–1944). Both became modestly wealthy during the 1930s. Parents of Gabi (1935– ) and Robert (1937– ).

Wiegand family
 Alois Wiegand (1870–1965), mayor of Schabbach who married Martha Wiegand (1878–1945). Parents of Gustav, Wilfried and Maria. Alois was an abrasive wealthy man who embraced status symbols, and later became a Nazi supporter. With his SS son Wilfried he oversaw the village's allegiance to Hitler during World War II.
 Gustav Wiegand (1897–1917), died as a World War I soldier. Not married; no children.
 Wilfried Wiegand (1915–1972), member of the SS during the war. He executed a downed British pilot under false pretenses. At a Schabbach party he revealed that Jews were being sent "up the chimney" and in the vein of Himmler lamented how his SS comrades suffered from this unpleasant task. He became a farmer after the war and was also a member of the Christian Democratic Union. Did not marry and had no children.
 Maria Wiegand Simon (7 August 1900 – 18 September 1982), matriarch of the family after World War II. Married Paul Simon and gave birth to Anton and Ernst. Gave birth in 1940 to Hermann, with Otto Wohlleben (1902–1944), a half-Jewish engineer who came to work on a new highway before the outbreak of war, and was killed defusing a bomb.
 Anton Simon (1923–1995), owner of Simon Optical factory. Married to Martha Hanke (1924–1987). Had numerous children born 1945–1953: Marlies, Hartmut, Dieter, Helga, and Gisela. Anton worked for a German Army propaganda unit during World War II and served on the Eastern Front. There is one scene showing him filming single executions – these are almost certainly partisans given that the time is 1943 (and widespread executions in the field had ceased on the orders of Himmler) and also the fact that the machine gun crew carrying out the executions are German Army regulars and not Einsatzgruppen. After the German defeat and subsequent imprisonment in a Russian labor camp, Anton walked home to Germany in the late 1940s. He arrived 10 May 1947, after walking five-thousand kilometres. He founded Simon Optical with investment from father Paul.
 Ernst Simon (1924–1997), German Air Force pilot and construction business owner. He had an early aptitude for flying. After the war he attempted unsuccessfully to operate a helicopter business. In the 1960s he started a thriving home-renovation business which destroyed the village's traditional architecture. 
 Hermann Simon (1940– ), conductor and composer. At age 15 he was in love with Klärchen Sisse, 26, who left the area after their affair was discovered. Moved away from the Hunsrück at age 18 to study music in Munich.

Schirmer family
 Katharina Schirmer (10 November 1875 – 10 May 1947), matriarch of the family before World War II. Married to Matthias Simon (see Matthias Simon above).
 Marie-Goot Schirmer (1882–1960), sister of Katharina Simon, married to Mäthes-Pat (1869–1949). Marie-Goot was characterized as a gossipy neighbor.
 Karl Glasisch (1900–1982), son of Marie-Goot. Mäthes-Pat is not his father. Throughout the film he was Schabbach's friendly, good-natured drunk, dissociated from village life but seeing all. He served as the story narrator.
 Hans Schirmer (20 April 1873 – 1943), lived in Bochum. Father of Fritz and brother of Katharina. Was remembered for having the same birthday as Hitler.
 Fritz Schirmer (1903–1937), young Communist sympathizer who lived in Bochum. Married Alice (1902–1945). Parents of Lotti and Ursel. Fritz was sent to a concentration camp, but he was later released on condition he stayed out of any political activity.
 Lotti Schirmer (1923– ), chief secretary of Simon Optical. Came from Bochum with Katherina after her father was arrested. After World War II she was a carefree single girl, a friend of Klärchen Sisse, and in later life she married Sepp Vilsmeier (1920– ). Adopted Vietnamese children Hoa (1973– ) and Hou (1975– ).
 Ursel Schirmer (1936–1945). Died during an air raid.
 Walter Schirmer (1899–1943), of Bochum, married Lilli (1901–1969). No children.

Other characters
 Klärchen Sisse (1929– ), worked at Simon Optik and was a friend of Lotti Schirmer. She enters the story in 1945, as a 16-yr-old refugee from elsewhere in Germany who has been advised by Ernst to go his mother's house in Schabbach, where she will be 'looked after'. Just as he says, Klärchen is accepted into the Simon household and effectively treated as one of the family, eventually gaining a position with Simon Optik. A 1956 love affair with Hermann Simon, who is 11 years her junior, results in her becoming pregnant, leaving the village and having an abortion. 
 Apollonia (c.1900–?), brief love interest for Paul Simon c. 1920. Was ostracized in Schabbach for her dark complexion. Had a child by a Frenchman and moved to France, never to be seen again.
 Martina (c.1910 – 1945), a prostitute from Berlin and friend of Lucie Hardtke who attempted to bring her trade to the Hunsrück. Was in love with Pollak (1910–1945), both died in Berlin.
 Hänschen Betz (c.1908 – 15 January 1944), son of the Schabbach basketmaker, had an injured eye from childhood. With the encouragement of soldiers he became a sharpshooter. Died on the Russian Front during World War II, for which Eduard felt some responsibility having encouraged Hänschen's shooting practice when young.
 Fritz Pieritz (c.1902–?), good-natured assistant to Otto Wohlleben, later worked for Anton Simon at Simon Optik.
 Denise de Gallimasch''' (c.1900–?), a French horse rider of debatable nobility en route from Paris to Berlin.

Reception

Release and awards
After premiering in Germany, Heimat was shown in Venice, London and New York festivals. It was shown in movie screens around the world in separate parts. However, it gained its worldwide exposure on television, across 26 countries. In order to shape the film into eleven episodes, Reitz devised introductory segments in which Kurt Wagner as Glasisch narrated the brief story so far, over photographs by Eduard Simon. In Germany, the broadcast received over fifteen million viewers.Heimat earned Edgar Reitz the FIPRESCI Prize at the 1984 Venice Film Festival, while Marita Breuer won the Darstellerpreis for Best Actress at the 1985 Bavarian Film Awards. In the United Kingdom the film won a BAFTA and the London Film Critics' Circle award for Best Foreign Language Film.Die Zweite Heimat premiered at the Venice Biennale and broadcast rights were purchased by television companies in 16 different countries. However, the German backers were disappointed that it received a smaller percentage-viewing share than the first. Reitz said the executives overlooked the fact that in 1984 only three channels existed compared to more than twenty in 1992. In the United States the film had a short theatrical run in New York at The Public Theater. It also screened at the Museum of Fine Arts, Boston and various Goethe Institute across the country. It was not picked up for television by US cable networks.

In Italy the film was shown at a large venue in Rome, that had sold out tickets weekly. Reitz was presented with the Eurofipa d’honneur award at the Cannes Film Festival in 1994.

Critical receptionHeimat received acclaim around the world. Many were enthusiastic how it never felt like a television movie, but a cinematic experience. Many praised the themes through the film about leaving and returning and simply how we connect to the larger world from our home. Reitz received thousands of letters from ordinary people, thanking him for retrieving and unlocking their memories of the 1919–1982 period. However, critic Leonie Naughton accused the film of presenting a "bourgeois history of the Third Reich, a homespun tale of innocence."Die Zweite Heimat received a lukewarm reception in the United States. National press coverage was limited to a single review by Stephen Holden in The New York Times, who described Hermann Simon as "a hotheaded romantic" and the film as a "alternately gripping and lyrical 13-episode serial about German life in the 1960s". Holden also declared the film to be "the ultimate highbrow soap opera for couch potatoes".

British press for Die Zweite Heimat was more enthusiastic with The Financial Times, The Observer and The Independent all praising it.

Lasting impactHeimat was one of director Stanley Kubrick's favourite films. It is ranked  59 in Empire magazine's "The 100 Best Films Of World Cinema" in 2010. It also finished in 6th place when BBC Two ran a 40th birthday poll celebrating the station's greatest programmes and was 10th in Channel 4's 50 Greatest TV Dramas.Heimat has faced some criticism for its selective interpretation of German history, with some writers noting that there is limited treatment of the hyperinflationary spiral of the 1920s, the Great Depression, or certain aspects of Nazi history such as the Holocaust of World War II. In 1985, Timothy Garton Ash wrote in The New York Review of Books that:When you show the 1930s as a golden age of prosperity and excitement in the German countryside, when you are shown the Germans as victims of the war, then you inevitably find yourself asking: But what about the other side? What about Auschwitz? Where is the director's moral judgment? To which the colour filters insistently reply: 'Remember, remember, this is a film about what Germans remember. Some things they remember in full colour. Some in sepia. Others they prefer to forget. Memory is selective. Memory is partial. Memory is amoral.'Heimat 's themes of decadent American values and Western corporate greed rising up against the innocent simplicity of the Hunsrück have been seen as "resurrecting a discourse that prevailed in the nineteenth century about the modernization of Germany's society and economy ... no compromises or delicate balances are possible".

Barbara Gabriel argued that the series was part of a larger movement of national memory work in Germany, provoked in part by the American television series Holocaust. As European art in general and German art in particular underwent a resurgence in the 1960s, artists like Günter Grass and Edgar Reitz captured international attention as they grappled with issues of identity in a divided, post-Holocaust Germany.

See also
 The Village'', a 2013 TV series set in England and inspired by the series.

References

External links

 
  Heimat script
  The Second Heimat script
 
 
 
Long article about Reitz and Heimat by Carole Angier, from Sight and Sound, 1991
Episode guides for all three series at bbc.co.uk
 heimat123.net – an English-language fansite with an introduction to and discussion about each episode
  (with some English) heimat123.de – a very comprehensive German fansite
  Photos of Heimat und Heimat3 film locations at Hunsrück, Germany
  Heimat-Fanpage.de – a German fansite with many multimedia elements (music, video, archive etc.)

1984 German television series debuts
1980s drama films
1980s German television miniseries
1990s German television miniseries
1990s German television series
2000s German television miniseries
2000s German television series
Das Erste original programming
Films directed by Edgar Reitz
Films set in Germany
Films set in West Germany
Films shot in Munich
German drama films
1980s German-language films
German-language television shows
Grimme-Preis for fiction winners
Hunsrück
West German films
1980s German films